Mirko Bazić (2 November 1938 – 10 March 2021) was a Croatian footballer and later football manager.

Career 
Bazić played in the Yugoslav Second League in 1958 with NK Metalac Zagreb. In 1962, he played with NK Nehaj, and later with FK Kozara Gradiška.

Managerial career 
In 1974, he was named the head coach for GNK Dinamo Zagreb in the Yugoslav First League. In 1976, he led Zagreb to the 1975–76 Yugoslav Cup final, but lost to Hajduk Split. In 1982, he managed NK Zagreb in the Yugoslav Second League, and later with NK Bjelovar. In 1987, he went abroad to coach in Canada's National Soccer League with Windsor Wheels. In his debut season with Windsor he assisted in securing the regular season title. He also led the team in winning the NSL Canadian Championship. He re-signed with Windsor for the 1988 season.

In 1989, he was named the head coach for North York Rockets in the Canadian Soccer League. He was dismissed on 21 August 1989. In 1993, he was appointed the head coach for Melbourne Croatia in the National Soccer League. In his debut season with Melbourne he was named the league's coach of the year. Throughout his tenure with Melbourne he led the club in securing the 1994–95 national championship. In 2002, he returned to manage Melbourne Croatia.

References 

1938 births
2021 deaths
Association football midfielders
Yugoslav footballers
Croatian footballers
FK Kozara Gradiška players
Yugoslav Second League players
Yugoslav football managers
Croatian football managers
GNK Dinamo Zagreb managers
NK Zagreb managers
FK Borac Banja Luka managers
Melbourne Knights FC managers
Yugoslav First League managers
Canadian National Soccer League coaches
National Soccer League (Australia) coaches
Yugoslav expatriate football managers
Expatriate soccer managers in Canada
Yugoslav expatriate sportspeople in Canada
Expatriate soccer managers in Australia
Croatian expatriate sportspeople in Australia